Prince Ahmed Omar Ahmadzai  is a Pakistani Politician from the Khan of Kalat family, son of the 34th Khan of Kalat, His Highness Mir Dawood Khan Ahmedzai, and brother of the current 35th Khan of Kalat His Highness Mir Suleman Dawood Jan. Prince Ahmed Omar Ahmadzai is currently serving as a member of the Senate of Pakistan from Balochistan since March 2021, and Chairman of the Senate of Pakistan Standing Committee on Communications. He represents Balochistan Awami Party (BAP). He is the Chairman and Founder of Balochistan International Squash League (BISL) since 2017.

References

Khans of Kalat
Year of birth missing (living people)
Pakistani Senators 2021–2027
Balochistan Awami Party politicians
Nawabs of Pakistan